Ladoga may refer to:

Lakes
 Lake Ladoga, largest lake in Europe

Military
 Ladoga APC, a Russian armoured personnel carrier.

Places
Russia
 Novaya Ladoga ("New Ladoga"), town in Leningrad Oblast
 Staraya Ladoga ("Old Ladoga"), a village in Leningrad Oblast

United States
 Ladoga, California, an unincorporated community
 Ladoga, Indiana, a town 
 Ladoga, Michigan, an unincorporated community 
 Ladoga, Wisconsin, an unincorporated community

See also
 Ladozhsky (disambiguation)